Channa Fernando (born 11 June 1988) is a Sri Lankan cricketer. He made his List A debut for Negombo Cricket Club in the 2017–18 Premier Limited Overs Tournament on 16 March 2018.

References

External links
 

1988 births
Living people
Sri Lankan cricketers
Negombo Cricket Club cricketers
Place of birth missing (living people)